Colby is a village and a civil parish in the English county of Norfolk.

History
Colby's name is of Viking origin and derives from the Old Norse for Koli's farmstead or village.

In the Domesday Book, Colby is recorded as a settlement of 21 households in the hundred of South Erpingham. In 1086, the village formed part of the East Anglian estates of King William I.

Geography
In the 2011 Census, Colby was recorded as a having 494 residents living in 213 households.

Colby falls within the constituency of North Norfolk and is represented at Parliament by Duncan Baker MP of the Conservative Party.

St. Giles' Church
Colby's parish church is of Norman origin and is dedicated to Saint Giles.

Notable Residents
 Jack van Poortvliet- Leicester Tigers and England rugby union player

War Memorial
Colby's war memorial is located inside St. Giles' Church and lists the following names for the First World War:
 Second-Lieutenant Reginald A. Sarsby (1893-1915), 10th Battalion, Royal Norfolk Regiment
 Pioneer Charles H. Lee (1892-1918), Royal Engineers
 Private Stanley A. Jordan (d.1918), 15th Battalion, Cheshire Regiment
 Private Frederick Doughty (1893-1917), Hertfordshire Regiment
 Private Stanley H. Rouse (1899-1918), 2nd (City of London) Battalion, London Regiment
 Private William E. Daniels (d.1915), 2/6th Battalion, Royal Norfolk Regiment
 Private Frederick J. Matthews (1896-1915), 7th Battalion, Royal Norfolk Regiment
 Private Cecil H. Burdett (1895-1916), 8th Battalion, Royal Norfolk Regiment
 Private Bertie H. Lown (1898-1917), 8th Battalion, Royal Norfolk Regiment
 Private Alfred E. Turner (1886-1916), 9th Battalion, Royal Norfolk Regiment
 Private Arthur W. Cooper (1892-1918), 7th Battalion, Suffolk Regiment
 Private D'Arcy W. W. Hardingham (1899-1918), 13th Battalion, East Yorkshire Regiment

And, the following for the Second World War:
 Corporal Edward L. Hall (1922-1943), 5th Battalion, Royal Norfolk Regiment
 Private Sidney Hudson (1920-1944), 2nd Battalion, Lincolnshire Regiment

References

Villages in Norfolk
Civil parishes in Norfolk
North Norfolk